The Chambers Park Log Cabin is a historic structure in Chambers Park, Federalsburg, Maryland.  It is a single-story log structure with a gabled roof covered in original wooden shingles layered over with asphalt shingles.  It has a stone chimney at one end, which replaced a brick one in 1993.  The cabin was built in 1936 by a crew funded by the National Youth Administration, a New Deal jobs program.  It is one of the few surviving New Deal constructions on Maryland's Eastern Shore.

The cabin was listed on the National Register of Historic Places in 2016.

See also
National Register of Historic Places listings in Caroline County, Maryland

References

Houses in Caroline County, Maryland
Houses on the National Register of Historic Places in Maryland
National Register of Historic Places in Caroline County, Maryland
Log cabins in the United States
Federalsburg, Maryland
National Youth Administration